François Abou Mokh, BS (born on 1 July 1921 in Ma'loula, Syria - died on 11 August 2006) was a Curial Bishop in the Melkite Patriarchate of Antioch in Syria.

Ecclesiastical biography

François Abou Mokh was ordained to the priesthood on July 12, 1946 and became Chaplain of the Melkite Basilica of the Most Holy Redeemer. From 1972 to 1978 he worked as procurator of the Melkite Patriarch of Antioch in Rome. With simultaneous appointment as Titular Archbishop of Palmyra of Greek Melkites he was on February 7, 1978 appointed bishop in the Melkite Patriarchate of Antioch. The Patriarch of Antioch Archbishop Maximos V Hakim and the archbishops Nicolas Hajj, SDS and Saba Youakim, BS consecrated him on 17 March 1978 to the episcopate. In addition to office he was from 1978 to 1984 and again from 1992 to 1995 Patriarchal Vicar of Damascus. On July 27, 1998, he retired by reasons of age after be appointed Bishop of the Curia in the Patriarchate of Antioch in 1997. From 1997 to 1998 he was also Protosyncellus for the Melkite Archdiocese of Damascus. Until his death on 11 August 2006, he was a retired active Curial Bishop of Antioch. Archbishop Abou Mokh assisted as co-consecrator at the following bishops:

 1981 - Michel Yatim, Archbishop of Latakia in Syria
 1981 - Ignace Raad, Archbishop of Sidon in Lebanon
 1981 - Gregory III Laham, BS Titular Archbishop of Tarsus of Greek Melkites and later Patriarch of Antioch
 1987 - Georges Kwaïter, BS, Archbishop of Sidon
 1990 - Ignatius Ghattas, BS, Bishop of Newton in the USA
 1992 - Isidore Battikha, BA, titular bishop of Pelusium dei Greco-Melkiti (Auxiliary Bishop of Damascus)
 1995 - Jean-Clément Jeanbart, Archbishop of Aleppo in Syria
 1996 - Issam John Darwich, BS, Bishop of Sydney in Australia
 2003 - Ibrahim Ibrahim, Bishop of Montreal in Canada

Works

 François Abou Mokh, Les Confessions d'un Arabe catholique, Centurion, 1991, (in French), .

References

External links
 http://www.catholic-hierarchy.org/bishop/baboumokh.html 

1921 births
2006 deaths
Melkite Greek Catholic bishops
Syrian bishops
Syrian Melkite Greek Catholics
People from Rif Dimashq Governorate
20th-century Eastern Catholic bishops